Stan Jones (born January 13, 1943) is a Libertarian Party politician who has twice run unsuccessfully for the United States Senate in 2002 and 2006, and three times unsuccessfully as the Libertarian nominee for governor of Montana, in 2000, 2004, and 2008. He is known for his artificially induced blue-grey skin tone, caused by argyria.

Medical condition
In his book The Disappearing Spoon, about the periodic table, author Sam Kean chronicled the experience of Jones, who developed argyria, which permanently turned his skin a blue-grey color, by consuming large quantities of home-made colloidal silver. Jones' purposeful consumption of silver, which he believed to be an antibiotic, was a measure he undertook in response to his fears that the Y2K problem would make antibiotics unavailable, an event that did not occur. The peculiar coloration of his skin featured prominently in media coverage of his unsuccessful campaign. Jones is reported to have said, given the chance to go back, he would do it all over again. Jones is not alone in his beliefs; the use of colloidal silver has found support among some notables, such as actress Gwyneth Paltrow and Infowars' Alex Jones. However, regarding colloidal silver, the National Institutes of Health have stated that “evidence supporting health-related claims is lacking”.

Policy stances
His stances on policy issues tend to be socially conservative; among other issues, he supports the death penalty, opposes same-sex marriage, and has called abortion a "crime against humanity." During the senatorial debate held on October 9, 2006, Jones proposed that a collaboration of European Union and North American elites are on the verge of forming a "one world communist government."

Personal life
He currently works as a business consultant in Bozeman, the seat of Gallatin County.

See also
Paul Karason

References

1943 births
Politicians from Bozeman, Montana
University of Maryland, College Park alumni
Living people
Montana Libertarians
People in alternative medicine
Silver